The 1994 London Israeli Embassy bombing was a car bomb attack on 26 July 1994 against the Israeli embassy building in London, England. Twenty civilians were injured. A second bomb was exploded outside Balfour House, Finchley, premises occupied by the UJIA, a registered British charity.

The attack 
A car containing  of explosives parked in front of the embassy blew up minutes after the driver left it. The blast, which caused widespread damage, was heard over a mile away. Apart from damage to the embassy building, shop windows were blown out. The attack took place one day after King Hussein of Jordan and Israeli Prime Minister Yitzhak Rabin met in Washington, D.C. to discuss a Jordan-Israel peace treaty.

Thirteen hours later another car bomb exploded outside Balfour House, which at the time was the London headquarters of one of the largest Jewish charities, The United Jewish Israel Appeal (UJIA), injuring six.

Aftermath 
Initially, the Israeli ambassador and British intelligence experts were blaming "pro-Iranian extremists, probably linked to the Lebanon-based Hezbollah group." A group calling themselves the Palestinian Resistance Jaffa Group claimed responsibility for both bombs.

Five Palestinians were arrested in London in January 1995 in connection with the bombings. In December 1996, two of them, both Palestinian science graduates educated in the UK, Jawad Botmeh and Samar Alami, were found guilty of "conspiracy to cause explosions" at the Old Bailey. They were sentenced to 20 years in jail, and lost their appeal in 2001.

Botmeh was released from prison in 2008.

Former MI5 agent David Shayler stated that the British security services were warned of a plan to attack the embassy in advance, yet took no action. The Crown Prosecution Service later confirmed a warning had been received, though it related to a plan by a group unconnected to those who were convicted of the bombing. The Home Secretary at the time, Jack Straw, said that Shayler's interpretation of events was understandable, but concluded that MI5 still could not have prevented the bombing.

Convicted
Samar Alami, a Lebanese-Palestinian woman and daughter of a banker, graduated with a BSc in chemical engineering from University College London and an MSc from Imperial College London.

Jawad Botmeh, a Palestinian student based in London, graduated with degrees in electronic engineering from the University of Leicester and King's College London.

Alami and Botmeh were convicted of conspiracy to cause explosions in the United Kingdom. During the trial Alami and Botmeh were accused of being part of a team that had planned the bombing but were not accused of planting the bomb themselves or being present at the scene of the crime. There was no direct evidence linking the suspects to the bombing. Another woman involved in carrying out the bombing has never been found. In the course of the trial, both suspects did admit that they had conducted experiments using home made explosives in order to pass information back to Palestinians in the occupied Palestinian territories. Botmeh and Alami were convicted of the charges in December 1996, receiving 20-year sentences.

Alami and Botmeh have maintained their innocence; Amnesty International stated that Botmeh had been "denied [his] right to a fair trial". Numerous groups and individuals campaigned on behalf of the pair, including the government of Palestine, Amnesty International, Unison (Britain's largest trade union), human rights activist Gareth Peirce, investigative journalist Paul Foot, and Miscarriages of JusticeUK (MOJUK), Support for Alami and Botmeh's appeal attracted cross-party support in Parliament – five early day motions raised by John Austin MP were supported by a total of 71 Members of Parliament, including Labour Party MPs Jeremy Corbyn and John McDonnell, Conservative Party MPs Peter Bottomley and Robert Jackson, and Liberal Democrats Tom Brake and Colin Breed. Beyond the early day motions, further support for a review of the conviction by parliamentarians included Ian Gilmour, Baron Gilmour of Craigmillar and Harry Cohen.

The pair's appeal against their convictions came to an end when their case was dismissed by the European Court of Human Rights in 2007. Upon review of the evidence, the court concluded that their right to a fair trial had not been infringed.

Following Botmeh's release from prison in 2008 he found work as a researcher at the London Metropolitan University. He was suspended from work on 7 February 2013, having become an activist for his trade union, Unison; they have pointed out that his suspension was related to his election as a staff representative, and that he had declared his conviction for involvement in two car bombs at the Israeli Embassy prior to appointment. His suspension was lifted in March 2015.

References

External links
Riddle of man behind Israeli embassy bomb (by Robert Fisk), The Independent, 26 November 1998
New evidence suggests activists were framed , The Daily Star, 24 March 1999

1994 in international relations
London Embassy bombing
Israeli Embassy bombing
1990s crimes in London
1990s trials
20th century in the Royal Borough of Kensington and Chelsea
Attacks on buildings and structures in 1994
Attacks on buildings and structures in London
Israeli
Attacks on diplomatic missions of Israel
Car and truck bombings in London
Israel–United Kingdom relations
Improvised explosive device bombings in 1994
Israeli Embassy bombing
July 1994 crimes
July 1994 events in the United Kingdom
Palestinian terrorist incidents in Europe
Terrorist incidents in the United Kingdom in 1994
Trials in London
Building bombings in London